The Medeoloideae (syn. Medeoleae) are a subfamily of monocotyledon perennial, herbaceous mainly bulbous flowering plants in the lily family, Liliaceae.


Description
The Medeoleae are characterised by rhizomatous stems, inconspicuous flowers, the formation of berries that are animal dispersed and broad reticulate-veined leaves.

Taxonomy 
In the most recent taxonomy of the AP Web system, this subfamily has been downgraded to a tribe, Medeoleae, within the subfamily Lilioideae.

The taxon includes two genera;

References 

Liliaceae
Monocot subfamilies